Glenn Noble Roberts (born 26 June 1988) is a retired Norwegian footballer of Gambian descent. In April 2008, he spent time on loan to Nybergsund together with then-teammate Amin Nouri. Roberts was transferred to Aalesunds FK in August 2008.

Career statistics

Personal life 
He was born in Oslo to a father from Gambia and a mother from Ålesund.

References

1988 births
Living people
Footballers from Oslo
Norwegian people of Gambian descent
Association football forwards
Norwegian footballers
Norway youth international footballers
Vålerenga Fotball players
Nybergsund IL players
Aalesunds FK players
Sarpsborg 08 FF players
Eliteserien players
Norwegian First Division players
Allsvenskan players
Åtvidabergs FF players
Norwegian expatriate footballers
Norwegian expatriate sportspeople in Sweden
Expatriate footballers in Sweden